The Mohawk River is a  river in northern New Hampshire in the United States. It is a tributary of the Connecticut River, which flows south to Long Island Sound, an arm of the Atlantic Ocean.

The Mohawk River rises at the outlet of Lake Gloriette in Dixville Notch and flows west-northwest to the Connecticut River in the town of Colebrook. It is paralleled for most of its length by New Hampshire Route 26.

See also 

 List of New Hampshire rivers

References

Rivers of New Hampshire
Tributaries of the Connecticut River
Rivers of Coös County, New Hampshire